Chenopodiopsis is a genus of flowering plants belonging to the family Scrophulariaceae.

Its native range is South African Republic.

Species:

Chenopodiopsis chenopodioides 
Chenopodiopsis hirta 
Chenopodiopsis retrorsa

References

Scrophulariaceae
Scrophulariaceae genera